The Voice is the fifth solo studio album by American soul singer Mavis Staples. This album was her second for Prince's Paisley Park Records label and was released on August 24, 1993. The song "Melody Cool" from the 1990 movie Graffiti Bridge appeared on this album as well as the movie soundtrack. The song "Positivity" is a cover of Prince's version from the 1988 album Lovesexy.

Track listing
All tracks composed by Prince; except where indicated
 "The Voice" (4:14) (Rosie Gaines, Prince)
 "House in Order" (4:44)
 "Blood Is Thicker Than Time" (3:13)
 "You Will Be Moved" (4:12)
 "All Because Of You" (5:06) (Billy Beck, Rick Brown)
 "Undertaker" (7:26) (Michael B., Levi Seacer, Jr., Prince. Sonny T.)
 "Melody Cool" (3:46)
 "Kain't Turn Back" (4:03) (Bernard Belle, Raymond Watkins)
 "I'll Be Right There" (4:03) (Emmanuel Rahiem LeBlanc, Gordon Williams)
 "A Man Called Jesus" (3:56)
 "Why" (4:27) (Mike Ferguson, Ivan Hampden, Danny Madden, Paulette McWilliams)
 "Positivity" (4:34)

References

External links
 
 

1993 albums
Mavis Staples albums
Albums produced by Prince (musician)
Paisley Park Records albums